

Eadbald was a medieval Bishop of Lindsey.

Eadbald was consecrated between 862 and 866. He died between 866 and 869. His successor is uncertain, who could be either Burgheard or Eadberht.

Citations

External links
 

Bishops of Lindsey